Andrew or Andy McLaren may refer to:

Andrew McLaren (curler), Scottish curler
Andrew McLaren (actor) (born 1980), American film and television actor
Andy McLaren (born 1973), Scottish international footballer
Andy McLaren (footballer, born 1922) (1922–1996), Scottish international footballer

See also
Andrew MacLaren (1883–1975), British politician